Nunnari is an Italian surname. Notable people with the surname include:

 Gianni Nunnari (born 1959), Italian film/television producer and executive
 Jodi Nunnari, American cell biologist and pioneer in the field of mitochondrial biology
 Paul Nunnari (born 1973), Australian Paralympic athlete
 Salvatore Nunnari (born 1939), Italian emerit Archbishop of Cosenza-Bisignano
 Talmadge Nunnari (born 1975), American former Major League Baseball player

Italian-language surnames